"Allegheny" is a song written and originally recorded by Chris Gantry.

Gantry included it on his 1970 album Motor Mouth and also released as a single.

The song was covered by the duo of Johnny Cash and June Carter. The cover was included on their 1973 album Johnny Cash and His Woman and also released as a single (Columbia 4-45929, with "We're for Love" from tne same album on the opposite side), reaching number 69 on U.S. Billboard country chart for the week of November 17.

Track listing

Charts

References

External links 
 "Allegheny" on the Johnny Cash official website

Chris Gantry songs
Johnny Cash songs
June Carter Cash songs
Songs written by Chris Gantry
1973 songs
1973 singles
Columbia Records singles